Willie Miller (born 1 November 1969) is a Scottish former footballer. He began and spent most of his career with Hibernian, for whom he played in nearly 250 league games. Miller won the 1991 Scottish League Cup Final with Hibs. He also played in the 1993 Scottish League Cup Final, which Hibs lost 2–1 to Rangers.

After leaving Hibs in 1998, he played for Dundee, Wrexham (on loan), Raith Rovers and Cowdenbeath. Miller retired from senior football in 2003.

Miller won ten caps for Scotland at under–21 level.

References

Sources

External links

Living people
1969 births
Scottish footballers
Scotland under-21 international footballers
Scottish Premier League players
Scottish Football League players
English Football League players
Hibernian F.C. players
Dundee F.C. players
Wrexham A.F.C. players
Raith Rovers F.C. players
Cowdenbeath F.C. players
Association football defenders
Footballers from Edinburgh